Rudolf Suchánek (born 27 January 1962) is a Czech ice hockey player. He competed in the men's tournament at the 1988 Winter Olympics.

Career statistics

Regular season and playoffs

International

References

External links
 

1962 births
Living people
Czech ice hockey defencemen
Olympic ice hockey players of Czechoslovakia
Ice hockey players at the 1988 Winter Olympics
Sportspeople from České Budějovice
Calgary Flames draft picks
Motor České Budějovice players
Czechoslovak expatriate sportspeople in Italy
Czechoslovak ice hockey defencemen
Expatriate ice hockey players in Italy
Czechoslovak expatriate ice hockey people